The Final Concert may refer to:
 The Final Concert (The Kingston Trio album)
 The Final Concert (Marvin Gaye album)